Brent Whitfield (born January 8, 1981 in Long Beach, California) is an American soccer player currently playing for Ventura County Fusion in the USL Premier Development League.

Career

College and Amateur
Whitfield played college soccer at California State University, Fullerton, in four seasons there he scored 23 goals and registered 9 assists.  Undrafted out of college, Whitfield played with the Southern California Seahorses in the USL Premier Development League during the 2004 season.

Professional
In 2005, Whitfield signed with the USL First Division side, the Seattle Sounders, subsequently playing in 25 games and scoring 6 goals.

Whitfield signed with Chivas USA of Major League Soccer in May 2006, and would go on to play 11 games with the club, scoring 1 goal, before Chivas released him at the end of the 2007 season.

He was hired to be player-head coach of the Los Angeles Legends in the USL Premier Development League for the 2009 season, replacing former head coach Phil Wolf. He scored three back-to-back hat tricks in his first three games for the team -  on June 5 in a 6-1 win over Lancaster Rattlers, on June 13 in a 7-1 win over Fresno Fuego, and on June 19 in a 5-0 win over Ogden Outlaws.

In 2010 Whitfield switched to the Ventura County Fusion, and scored a hat trick on his Fusion debut on May 1 in a game against the Lancaster Rattlers.

Coaching
Whitfield was the coach of men's soccer team at Long Beach City College from 2001 to 2006, and was player-coach of the Los Angeles Legends in the USL Premier Development League in 2009.

References

External links

 CSU Fullerton Player Profile

1981 births
Living people
African-American soccer players
American soccer coaches
American soccer players
Association football forwards
Cal State Fullerton Titans men's soccer players
Chivas USA players
Hollywood United Hitmen players
LA Laguna FC players
Major League Soccer players
National Premier Soccer League players
Seattle Sounders (1994–2008) players
Southern California Seahorses players
Soccer players from Long Beach, California
USL First Division players
USL League Two players
Ventura County Fusion players
21st-century African-American sportspeople
20th-century African-American people